The Dan Technology Senior Tournament of Champions was a senior (over 50s) men's professional golf tournament on the European Senior Tour. It was played from 1996 to 2001. From 1996 to 2000 it was held at Buckinghamshire Golf Club, Denham, Buckinghamshire while in 2001 it was played at Mere Golf and Country Club, Mere, Cheshire, England. The 2001 event had total prize of £150,000 with the winner receiving £25,000.

Winners

References

Former European Senior Tour events
Golf tournaments in England
Recurring sporting events established in 1996
Recurring sporting events disestablished in 2001